Josiah Leming (born March 26, 1989) is an American singer-songwriter originally from Morristown, Tennessee. At the age of 17, Leming dropped out of high school and began traveling across the United States to play shows while living out of his car. He eventually caught the eye of executives at Warner Brothers Records who signed him to his first major label record deal in 2008. Leming's debut album, Come On Kid, from Warner Bros. came out September 13, 2010. His main influences are Bob Dylan, Leonard Cohen, Ryan Adams and The Rolling Stones.

Biography
Josiah Leming was born in Morristown, Tennessee. He was raised by his mother and stepfather alongside four brothers and four sisters, six of whom are adopted. Leming first learned the piano when he was eight years old, after his mother purchased a Casio keyboard for nothing.  He also played his grandmother's piano during visits to her house, and participated in school musicals and choirs. Described as "self-taught", he also credits an "elderly piano instructor" for his early musical education.

By 13, Leming was writing his own music. A friend introduced him to the music of DC Talk, Coldplay and Travis, Neil Young, Bob Dylan, Ryan Adams, and The Smiths at 15. They had some influence on Leming's musical style. When he was 16, Leming began to perform locally. He dropped out of high school and left Morristown at 17, in an attempt to both make it as a musician and find a way to support his large and struggling family. Leming played in clubs and coffeehouses throughout the Southeast while working at restaurants and temp agencies to pay for food and gas. He traveled to Atlanta, Georgia in late 2007 when he heard American Idol would hold auditions there.

Musical career
In 2007 Leming self-released The Paperplain EP and Her EP on his MySpace page for digital download—neither EP is available now.

Leming signed a record deal with Warner Bros. in 2008 and began work on his debut album Come on Kid. To promote the album, Warner Bros. released Angels Undercover EP in 2008 and Punk Ass Rain EP in 2009. Meanwhile, Leming recorded Come on Kid in London and Los Angeles, with the help of producers Jesse Owen Astin, Martin Terefe, Warren Huart and David Kosten. Two songs from Angels Undercover EP are featured on the album--"To Run" and "Arctic Outcry Wind".

Come on Kid was released on September 13, 2010, after some delays. "It was emotional, and it took a long time," Leming tells Billboard.com. "In order to make an album that everybody was happy with, and also that I felt good about, it took the good part of two years to kind of wrangle that in." While these delays were rumored to have been caused by contract disputes with 19 Entertainment, both Leming and 19 now say that the "disputes" were simply a misunderstanding.

Come on Kid failed commercially, which prompted Warner Bros. to drop Leming from the label in late 2010.

Leming recorded music independently in Burbank, California for three years before returning to Tennessee in early Fall 2011. He released a new single "What You've Taken" on February 6, 2011, in conjunction with the launch of his official website. The single was available on his website for free download until March 6, 2011.

Leming plays in different venues across the country to promote his music. In addition, he does a live 30-minute broadcast on Stickam usually every Sunday at 6:30 PDT, performing his songs and updating viewers on the progress of his musical career. He also regularly updates his Facebook and Twitter page.

During a live Stickam broadcast on July 24, 2011, Leming announced he will self-release his second album September 2011; however, he later pushed the release date to October or November 2011.

Leming released three singles from his second album in anticipation of its release. On September 24, 2011, he released a studio recorded version of his well-known song, "One Last Song". "Too Young" was released on October 24, 2011, followed by "Another Life" on November 10, 2011.

His self-released second album, titled "Another Life" was released on November 29, 2011.

On September 16, 2014, he released his new single and video "Long Gone" exclusively through Yahoo! Music. This is the first single of his new upcoming record. The second single 'Can You Hear It' was released January 6, 2015.

Leming's "To Run" is the only song written by an American Idol contestant to be covered in the Kidz Bop series.

On American Idol
Leming is the only contestant in the history of American Idol to not make the 'Top 24' and land a major label record deal. He was a contestant on Season 7 of  American Idol; the producers were interested in his life as a traveling musician living out of his car. In an interview with MTV News, Leming said he was disappointed with how they portrayed his life as a "sob story". "I wanted to stand on my voice, and my own two feet," he explained, "but they wanted to know about the story and they wanted to use it. I definitely wasn't going for the sympathy vote."

He became a popular contestant after singing his rendition of "Grace Kelly" by English singer Mika. However, Leming did not make it to the top 24 for his performance of "Stand by Me" by Ben E. King; Randy Jackson and Paula Abdul refused to side with Simon Cowell in his wish to see Leming advance to the semi-finals.

Leming later admitted the performance was poor. "I didn't know that song, so I was trying to make it my own, and I focused more on the words than the melody. And that's why it was kind of all messed up." He wanted to sing "Take Me Out" by Franz Ferdinand, but was not allowed to—Leming did not know why.

Cowell is on record saying that he feels it was a mistake not to put Leming through to the next round, having stated: "We should have put him through. I was all for it. I wanted him in the competition." Leming's controversial ouster is widely believed to be one factor behind the return of wild cards to the selection process in Season 8.

Leming's popularity grew after returning to Tennessee. He gained more followers on MySpace. In addition, many label representatives called him, and producers of The Ellen DeGeneres Show invited Leming to make a guest appearance, which he accepted. Leming signed a record deal with Warner Bros.

Discography
The Paperplain, self-released EP, (2007)
Her, self-released EP (2007)
Angels Undercover, EP (2008)
26 on Top Heatseekers
Punk Ass Rain, EP (2009)
Come On Kid (2010)
Another Life (2011)
Listen Close Live (2013)
Cold Blood EP (2018) (under Josiah and the Bonnevilles)
On Trial (2018) (under Josiah and the Bonnevilles)
Motel Mayday (2021) (under Josiah and the Bonnevilles)
2022 (2022) (under Josiah and the Bonnevilles)

References

American Idol participants
People from Morristown, Tennessee
1989 births
Living people
Singers from Tennessee
21st-century American guitarists
Guitarists from Tennessee
American male pianists
American male guitarists
21st-century American pianists
21st-century American male singers
21st-century American singers